The Greece national baseball team represents Greece in international baseball play. The team are a member of the World Baseball Softball Confederation and WBSC Europe.

2004 Olympics
The first time that Greece put together a national team that got any recognition in the baseball world was during the 2004 Athens Olympic Games. Greece, as the host country, was faced with the dilemma that the actual baseball talent pool in the country was very small, and what players were available were amateur. However, as a result of lenient citizenship laws, various minor leaguers from the United States were able to play for the Greeks. Among the better known players were Baltimore Orioles prospect Nick Markakis, former Major Leaguer Clay Bellinger and various other players of Greek descent. The team's American coach, Dusty Rhodes led them to a 7th-place finish in the tournament, with a single win against Italy.

Tournament results
Olympic Games

European Baseball Championship

Baseball World Cup

Current roster

References

External links 
www.greekbaseball.com
English Language website on Greek Baseball

National baseball teams in Europe
National
Baseball